Kern Aaron Miller (born 2 September 1991) is an English footballer who plays as a defender for Stamford.

He has previously played for Football League clubs Lincoln City, Barnsley, Accrington Stanley and Hereford United, as well as in non-league football for Boston United Gainsborough Trinity, Worksop Town, Grantham Town, King's Lynn Town,  Stamford, Corby Town, Spalding United and Frickley Athletic.

Career

Lincoln City
Miller was a produce of the Lincoln City youth team and was drafted into The Imps first team squad during the 2008–2009 season. He made 1 appearance for The Imps, the 2–0 away win over Accrington Stanley. At the end of his scholarship, Miller alongside fellow scholars Nathan Adams and Andy Hutchinson agreed a six-month professional contract with the club.

Barnsley
On 4 January 2011 after being released from Lincoln, he signed for Barnsley in the Football League Championship. On 28 July 2011 he signed a 6-month loan deal for League Two club Accrington Stanley. He made his debut on 6 August 2011 against Northampton Town. In November 2011 Miller was released from his loan deal early after suffering a broken jaw in an off the field incident. He made a total of 3 appearances. Upon his release from the loan spell at Accrington Stanley Miller joined fellow League Two club Hereford United on a loan deal till the end of the 2011/2012 season.

Hereford United
Despite not playing a single match for Hereford during a brief loan spell, he joined the club on non-contract terms following his release from Barnsley. However, he was released by the club for undisclosed reasons, again without making a first team appearance.

Move into non-league
Having already been registered for three different Football League clubs Miller was only eligible to join a club below the Conference National, so on 9 March he joined Conference North side Gainsborough Trinity on a contract until the end of the season. Miller was eventually loaned out to Worksop Town returning at the end of the season. Miller was not amongst those players retained at the end of the 2011–12 season and thus left the club.

On 23 July 2012 he joined Boston United on a one-year contract. Despite starting the Pilgrims first six Football Conference North games, he was released by the club on 8 September 2012 with the club's manager Jason Lee stating that the decision was made to enable the club to free up some money to give them room to manoeuvre in the transfer market. He moved on to join former loan club, Worksop Town.

In June 2013, he agreed terms to remain at Worksop Town for the 2013–14 season. In September 2013 Miller joined Grantham Town.

Miller signed for Southern League side King's Lynn Town in June 2015. He made a total of 41 appearances in all competitions for King's Lynn during the 2015/16 season, his only goals being a brace against Wroxham in the FA Cup.

After a spell at Stamford, Miller signed for Northern Premier League rivals Frickley Athletic in August 2020, making his debut in the F.A. Cup against Newcastle Benfield. He left the club ahead of the 2021/22 season.

In July 2021, Miller joined his home town club Skegness Town.

Personal life
On 16 December 2010 it was reported that Miller received a broken jaw when he was set upon and assaulted while on a night out in Blackpool.

References

External links

1991 births
Living people
People from Skegness
English footballers
Association football defenders
Accrington Stanley F.C. players
Barnsley F.C. players
Boston United F.C. players
Gainsborough Trinity F.C. players
Hereford United F.C. players
Lincoln City F.C. players
Worksop Town F.C. players
Grantham Town F.C. players
English Football League players
King's Lynn Town F.C. players
Stamford A.F.C. players
Corby Town F.C. players